Darlings is the second studio album by Broken Social Scene co-founder Kevin Drew. It was released on March 18, 2014 through Arts & Crafts Productions.

The album was recorded at the Banff Centre in Alberta with Graham Lessard and then taken to a house in Northern Ontario with Dave Hamelin for final recording and mixing. The album also features longtime collaborators Charles Spearin and Ohad Benchetrit along with Dean Stone.

Critical reception
Darlings was met with generally favorable reviews from critics. At Metacritic, which assigns a weighted average rating out of 100 to reviews from mainstream publications, this release received an average score of 67, based on 18 reviews.

Track listing

Charts

References

2014 albums
Kevin Drew albums
Arts & Crafts Productions albums